The blacktip poacher (Xeneretmus latifrons) is a fish in the family Agonidae. It was described by Charles Henry Gilbert in 1890. It is a marine, deep water-dwelling fish which is known from British Columbia, Canada to Baja California, Mexico, in the eastern Pacific Ocean. It dwells at a depth range of 18–400 metres, and inhabits soft benthic sediments. Males can reach a maximum total length of 19 centimetres.

The blacktip poacher is preyed on by hake, flatfish, and lancetfish. Its own diet consists of mysid crustaceans.

References

Blacktip poacher
Fish described in 1890